The Hunchback and the Dancer is a 1920 silent German horror film directed by F. W. Murnau and photographed by Karl Freund. This is now considered to be a lost film. The film was written by Carl Mayer, who also wrote The Cabinet of Dr. Caligari (1920). Karl Freund later emigrated to Hollywood where he directed such classic horror films as The Mummy (1932) and Mad Love (1935). It premiered at the Marmorhaus in Berlin.

Plot
A repulsive hunchback named James Wilton changes his relationship with women when he discovers a diamond mine in Java. A young woman named Gina, on the rebound from an earlier relationship, begins dating him. Later when she decides to break up with him and go back to her former lover, the hunchback manages to taint her with a poisonous substance that will kill anyone who kisses her. After two of her paramours die before her eyes, she finally catches on that he had contaminated her, and she decides to get revenge by luring the hunchback into kissing her himself.

Cast
 Sascha Gura as Gina
 John Gottowt as James Wilton
 Paul Biensfeldt as Smith
 Henri Peters-Arnolds as Percy
 Bella Polini as Tänzerin
 Werner Krauss (unconfirmed)
 Lyda Salmonova (unconfirmed)
 Anna von Palen as  Smith's mother

See also
List of lost films

References

External links

1920 films
1920 horror films
1920 lost films
German silent feature films
German black-and-white films
Films of the Weimar Republic
Films directed by F. W. Murnau
Lost horror films
Films with screenplays by Carl Mayer
Lost German films
German horror films
Silent horror films
1920s German films